Mandé Bukari University (French: Université Mandé Bukari, abbreviated UMB) is a private institution of higher learning and research in Bamako, the capital of Mali.

History 
Mandé Bukari University was created in 1999 by the professor Chéibane Coulibaly. It was recognized by the Malian authorities on October 27, 2008. It was previously a member of the Agence universitaire de la Francophonie.

Degrees offered 
UMB provides degrees in the following subjects:

 Legal, Economic, and Political Science
 Organizational Management
 Marketing
 Accounting and Finance
 Human Resource Management
 Audit and Management Control
 IT Management
 Statistics
 Cooperations
 Development
 Law and Development
 Socioeconomics of Development
 Sociology/Anthropology
 Processing of Agro-Food Products
 Agricultural Policies and Peasant Economies
 Rural Development
 Environmental Management
 Rural Engineering

References 

Universities in Mali
Educational institutions established in 1999
1999 establishments in Mali
Bamako